Pratima "Tima" Bansal  is a Canadian economist and management professor. She is a professor of strategy at the Ivey Business School and director of Ivey's Centre on Building Sustainable Value. She is the founder and executive director of the Network for Business Sustainability, a vehicle aimed at sharing academic research on business sustainability with managers. In April 2020, she was appointed to chair the expert panel on the circular economy by the Council of Canadian Academies.

Before entering academia, Bansal worked as a government economist and management consultant for Nicholls Applied Management. She was elected a fellow of the Royal Society of Canada in 2018.

Education
After graduating from the University of Calgary with a Bachelor of Arts, Bansal attended the University of Western Ontario and the University of Oxford where she got her Doctorate of Philosophy (DPhil) in management studies at the Said Business School.

Career and work
Before entering academics, Bansal worked as a government economist and management consultant for Nicholls Applied Management.

In 2005, Bansal founded and directed the Centre on Building Sustainable Value at the University of Western Ontario's Richard Ivey School of Business. She also founded the Network for Business Sustainability, which links researchers and managers to challenge current ideas of sustainability. As a result, in 2007 she was nominated for the YMCA Women of Distinction Award and was the recipient of the Faculty Pioneer Award in Academic Leadership by the Aspen Institute the following year.

Bansal served as an associate editor of Academy of Management Journal from 2010 until 2013. In 2011, Bansal was appointed to the inaugural Clean50 with 49 other Canadians for her contributions to improving sustainability and clean capitalism. In her final year as an associate editor, Bansal was named a Tier 1 Canada Research Chair in business sustainability. She was also named the 2013 Fetner Sustainable Enterprise Fellow by the Sustainable Enterprise Partnership. In 2015, Bansal was honoured with the two Best Paper awards from the Academy of Management.

From 2016 until 2019, Bansal served as a deputy editor for the Academy of Management Journal. While in this position, Bansal received accolades for her contributions to improving sustainability. In 2017, a year after her promotion, Bansal was selected to lead a group of researchers from the Ivey Business School, University of Alberta and the University of Quebec at Montreal to collaborate with Canada's Oil Sands Innovation Alliance (COSIA). In August, Bansal was honoured with the Distinguished Scholar award by the Organizations and Natural Environment division of the Academy of Management. The next year, Bansal was elected a fellow of the Royal Society of Canada and was one of two Canadians to receive the Ideas Worth Teaching Awards from the Aspen Institute Business & Society Program.

In her last year, Bansal received the 2019 Best Article Award in the California Management Review for her article "CSR Needs CPR: Corporate Sustainability and Politics". She also received funding from the Social Sciences and Humanities Research Council of Canada (SSHRC) for her research with Diane-Laure Arjaliès. In 2022, her study on time and sustainability published in the Academy of Management Journal received the Responsible Research in Management Award.

Bansal's research focuses on how organizations can manage sustainability issues and challenges such as climate change. She was instrumental in federating researchers around this issue thanks to the Network for Business Sustainability.

References

External links 

Canada Research Chair profile
Network for Business Sustainability

Living people
Place of birth missing (living people)
Canadian women economists
Canadian women academics
Fellows of the Royal Society of Canada
Canada Research Chairs
Academic staff of the University of Western Ontario
University of Western Ontario alumni
Alumni of the University of Oxford
Year of birth missing (living people)
Management scientists